ExploreLearning is a Charlottesville, Virginia-based company which operates a large library of interactive online simulations for mathematics and science education in grades 3–12 called 'Gizmos'. ExploreLearning also makes Reflex, an online, game-based system for math fact memorization. ExploreLearning is a business unit of Cambium Learning Group.

Products

Gizmos
"Gizmos" are a collection of online interactive simulations that are operated by ExploreLearning. The simulations are centered on science education and mathematics.

These simulations have been recognized with many educational awards. The Gizmos earned finalist honors from the Software and Information Industry Association. They have been the subject of numerous scholarly studies of educational technology.

Reflex
Reflex is an adaptive, game-based solution for assessing and developing math fact fluency in grade 2-8 students. Reflex has been recognized with many educational awards, including the "Best K-12 Instructional Solution" Codie award from the Software and Information Industry Association.

References

External links 
 ExploreLearning website
 ExploreLearning, Inc. snapshot on Bloomberg Businessweek

Educational software companies
Software companies based in Virginia
American educational websites
Mathematics websites
American science websites
Software companies of the United States